Mika Nurmela (born 26 December 1971) is a Finnish former professional footballer who played as a midfielder. He is the sporting director of Finnish Ykkönen club AC Oulu. His son Anselmi Nurmela is also a professional footballer.

International
Nurmela was capped 71 times for the Finland national team, scoring four goals. He ended his international career in January 2008.

Career statistics
Scores and results list Finland's goal tally first, score column indicates score after each Nurmela goal.

Honours
Finnish Cup: 1994, 2006

References

1971 births
Living people
Sportspeople from Oulu
Finnish footballers
Association football wingers
Association football fullbacks
Finland international footballers
Finland youth international footballers
Finland under-21 international footballers
Oulun Luistinseura players
FC Haka players
Malmö FF players
Turun Palloseura footballers
SC Heerenveen players
FC Emmen players
1. FC Kaiserslautern players
Heracles Almelo players
Helsingin Jalkapalloklubi players
Rovaniemen Palloseura players
AC Oulu players
Veikkausliiga players
Allsvenskan players
Eredivisie players
Eerste Divisie players
Bundesliga players
Expatriate footballers in Sweden
Finnish expatriate sportspeople in Sweden
Expatriate footballers in the Netherlands
Finnish expatriate sportspeople in the Netherlands
Expatriate footballers in Germany
Finnish expatriate sportspeople in Germany